Georg Georgiev Iliev (born 23 October 1994) is a Bulgarian professional footballer who plays as a midfielder.

Club career 
Born in Sofia, Bulgaria, Iliev kicked off his youth career with the local club CSKA Sofia before being transferred to Bolton Wanderers  youth academy in 2011. In 2014, he signed a professional contract with the club.

On 17 October 2014, Iliev joined League Two side Carlisle United on a monthlong loan deal. He made his debut against Plymouth Argyle playing the whole 90 minutes of the match. He returned to Bolton at the end of the month loan, having made four appearances.

On 15 May 2015, Bolton announced that Iliev had been released along with 12 other players.

On 31 January 2016, it was announced that Slavia Sofia had signed Iliev as a free agent.  He was released a year later.

Career statistics

Club

References

External links 
 
 
 UEFA profile

1994 births
Living people
Association football midfielders
Bulgarian footballers
Bulgaria youth international footballers
Bolton Wanderers F.C. players
Carlisle United F.C. players
PFC Slavia Sofia players
English Football League players
Footballers from Sofia